B.Cholenahalli is a small village in Hassan district of Karnataka state, India.

Location
It is part of Channarayapatna tehsil.

Postal code
The village has a post office and the postal code is 573116.

Demographics
There are 1,036 people living in the village according to the latest census.  There are 289 houses in the village.

See also
 Kantharajapura
 Shravaneri

References

Villages in Hassan district